is a village occupying Izena Island in the north of Okinawa Prefecture, Japan (though administered as part of Shimajiri District).  There are five localities of about equal size and population located on the island: Izena, Nakada, Shomi, Uchihana, and Jicchaku (also called Serikyaku).

Izena's primary claim to fame is that it was the birthplace of King Shō En, the first king of the Second Shō Dynasty. It is also the birthplace of the contemporary artist Naka Bokunen and musician  (伊禮 俊一 Irei Shun'ichi).

As of October 2016, the island has an estimated population of 1,518 and a density of 98 persons per square kilometer. The total area is 15.42 km2 (5.95 mi2).

The island is accessible by a ferry that makes two daily round trips between Nakada Port and Unten Port in Nakijin Village, which is located North of Nago on Okinawa's main island.  The ferry trip takes approximately one hour.  Izena also has an airfield, though daily service to the island by airplane was halted in 2007.

The island's topography features a row of mountains spanning from the northwest to the southeast of the island, with generally flat, arable land covering the remainder.  The island has several sandy beaches and designated camping areas with bathroom facilities.  The view of Izena's rocky southern coastline is well known as one of Japan's best, with the rock formations 'Umi Gitara' and 'Agi Gitara' dramatically rising from the land and sea.

Izena's main crops are sugar and the edible seaweed mozuku, but there are also several rice paddies, livestock farms, and a cattle breeding facility.  From December through April, sugar is harvested and processed at a refinery on the island before being exported.  There is an awamori distillery in Izena Village that produces several varieties of the beverage.

Commerce on the island is limited to a small grocery store, gas station, farmer's market, and building supply store that are operated by Japan's Central Union of Agricultural Cooperatives, several other independently owned convenience stores, restaurants, and bars in each of the island's 5 villages, and several hotels along the beach and in the island's center.  There is a scuba diving shop in Nakada Village open in the summer that provides equipment and tours.

As of 2010, the average size of each grade is 20 students.

Izena Island hosts an annual triathlon, the Izena 88 (2 km swim + 66 km bike + 20 km run) in the Autumn, participation of which (in 2007) was numbered at around 830. There is also a kids' triathlon for island residents on the day preceding the main race.

Izena is one of only a handful of places in Okinawa that was not ravaged by American and Japanese military forces during World War II, although American bombing bombing on the nearby island of Iheya resulted in approximately 50 civilian deaths. When American Marines landed on Izena during the night of June 23, 1945, they encountered no hostile defenses or enemy combatants and left shortly thereafter.

Climate

Education
There are a kindergarten, junior high school and elementary school, all located near the center of the island and serving all five villages.

Okinawa Prefectural Board of Education operates senior high schools elsewhere in the prefecture.

After graduating from junior high school, students must move to mainland Okinawa if they wish to attend high school. In the sense that they no longer live together, the island's youth become independent from their parents at 15 years old.

References

External links

 
 Izena official website 

Villages in Okinawa Prefecture